The following is a list of United Nations Security Council resolutions relating to Lebanon.

List of resolutions

See also 
 :Category:United Nations Security Council resolutions concerning Lebanon

 
Lebanon
United Nations